Carlsbad is a city in and the county seat of Eddy County, New Mexico, United States. As of the 2020 census, the city population was 32,238. Carlsbad is centered at the intersection of U.S. Routes 62/180 and 285, and is the principal city of the Carlsbad-Artesia Micropolitan Statistical Area, which has a total population of 55,435. Located in the southeastern part of New Mexico, Carlsbad straddles the Pecos River and sits at the eastern edge of the Guadalupe Mountains.

Carlsbad is a hub for potash mining, petroleum production, and tourism. The Lincoln National Forest is to the northwest of town.

History 
The development of southeastern New Mexico in the late 19th century was fueled by the arrival of colonies of immigrants from England, Switzerland, France, and Italy. Located along the banks of the Pecos River, Carlsbad was originally christened the town of Eddy on September 15, 1888, and organized as a municipal corporation in 1893; the settlement bore the name of Charles B. Eddy, co-owner of the Eddy-Bissell Livestock Company. With the commercial development of local mineral springs near the flume for medicinal qualities, the town later voted to change its name to Carlsbad after the famous European spa Carlsbad, Bohemia (now Karlovy Vary, Czech Republic), which in turn was named after Charles IV, Holy Roman Emperor and King of Bohemia. On March 25, 1918, the growing town surpassed a population of 2,000, allowing then-governor of New Mexico Washington Ellsworth Lindsey to proclaim Carlsbad a city.

Most of Carlsbad's development was due to irrigation water. Local cattlemen recognized the value of diverting water from the Pecos River to the grazing lands on Eddy's Halagueno Ranch. Many construction projects were undertaken to establish an irrigation system within the town. The Avalon Dam was constructed upstream of town, and canals diverted the water into town. Conflict arose when the canals met the river downstream; as a result, the Pecos River Flume was built, first out of wood and later concrete (the flume is often titled the only place where a river crosses itself).

Key to the growth of the area was special excursion trains that brought visitors from the East at reduced fares. Before the Pecos Valley Railroad arrived in 1891, travel parties met at the railroad station in Toyah, Texas, and were driven by buggy  over a rough, dusty road to this small but growing settlement on the banks of the Pecos River. Most of the early construction in Carlsbad was completed with locally manufactured bricks. The bricks were quite soft and of poor quality. The former First National Bank building at the corner of Canal and Fox streets is one of the few remaining buildings constructed with local brick. The re-discovery of Carlsbad Caverns (then known as "Bat Cave") by local cowboys in 1901 and the subsequent establishment of Carlsbad Caverns National Park on May 14, 1930, gained the town of Carlsbad substantial recognition.

In 1925, potash was discovered near Carlsbad, and for many years Carlsbad dominated the American potash market. Following the decline of the potash market in the 1960s, the residents and leaders of Carlsbad lobbied for the establishment of the Waste Isolation Pilot Plant (WIPP), a site where low-level nuclear waste would be stored thousands of feet underground in salt beds. Congress authorized the WIPP project in 1979, and construction began in 1980. The DOE Carlsbad Area Office opened in 1993, and the first waste shipment arrived in 1999.

Currently, Carlsbad has experienced a "boom". The city is leading in the production of oil and natural gases across the entire area, causing an increase in the employment rate. Due to this increase families and individuals have begun to migrate to Carlsbad.

Geography and climate
Carlsbad is situated in the northern reaches of the Chihuahuan Desert ecoregion, in the lower Pecos River Valley. US Routes 62 and 180 lead northeast  to Hobbs and southwest  to El Paso.

Most of the water within city limits consists of the Pecos River and Lake Carlsbad recreation area. The river flows into the northern part of Carlsbad, downstream from Lake Avalon and Brantley Lake, passes east of downtown, and exits in the southeast. Dark Canyon Draw also runs through the southern part of town, but only drains during heavy rainfall.

Carlsbad is part of the Interior West climate zone. It is classified as hot semi-arid (Köppen BSh), meaning average annual precipitation is less than potential evapotranspiration, but more than half. A moderate amount of rain falls each year, with the maximum occurring during July. Winters in Carlsbad are dry and mild, below freezing temperatures are a common occurrence at night. Springs are warm but can be occasionally hot. Summers are very hot which is very common for southern Plains of New Mexico and West Texas and average around 35 days per year 
of temperatures above  which can be unpleasant. Carlsbad is affected be the North American 
Monsoon during summer which can bring torrential downpours and flooding, which lowers daytime summer temperatures from the scorching great plains heat. Fall is generally warm and can be cold at times.

Demographics

2010 Census
As of the census of 2010, there were 26,138 people, 10,257 households, and 6,898 families residing in the city. The population density was 920.4/mi2 (353.2/km2). There were 11,421 housing units at an average density of 402.6 per square mile (155.4/km2).

The racial makeup of the city was: 
77.4% White (53.1% non-Hispanic)
1.9% Black or African American
1.3% Native American
1.0% Asian
<0.1% Pacific Islander
15.28% from other races
3.1% Multiracial (two or more races)
42.5% of the population were Hispanics or Latinos (of any race)

There were 10,257 households, out of which 29.2% had children under the age of 18 living with them, 46.0% were married couples living together, 14.0% had a female householder with no husband present, and 32.7% were non-families. 28.1% of all households were made up of individuals, and 11.4% had someone living alone who was 65 years of age or older. The average household size was 2.50 and the average family size was 3.03.

In the city, the population was spread out, with 25.6% under the age of 18, 9.0% from 18 to 24, 23.8% from 25 to 44, 26.1% from 45 to 64, and 15.6% who were 65 years of age or older. The median age was 39.4 years. For every 100 females, there were 96.5 males. For every 100 females age 18 and over, there were 93.6 males.

The median income for a household in the city was $30,658, and the median income for a family was $35,640. Males had a median income of $31,214 versus $19,228 for females. The per capita income for the city was $16,496. 16.5% of the population and 13.1% of families were below the poverty line. Out of the total population, 21.4% of those under the age of 18 and 11.2% of those 65 and older were living below the poverty line.

Government
The city of Carlsbad has a mayor-council form of government. Voters elect both the mayor and the eight members of the city council (two for each ward), who pass laws and make policy. After the first meeting of the city council once newly elected council members are seated, the council elects a Mayor pro tempore who serves as mayor in absence of the elected mayor.

Economy

The economy of the Carlsbad area is based primarily on the mineral extraction sector; the city overlies the rich oil- and gas-producing formations of the Permian Basin and produces more potash than any other location in the United States. Carlsbad is home to the DOE's Carlsbad Field Office which operates the Waste Isolation Pilot Plant to safely store the transuranic nuclear wastes from the nation's defense sites. Tourism is a major factor with Carlsbad Caverns National Park, Guadalupe Mountains National Park, Lincoln National Forest, the Living Desert Zoo and Gardens State Park, and the annual Christmas on the Pecos Light Show all located within fifty miles of the city.

Mining
Potash is a potassium-containing compound used as a fertilizer, along with nitrogen and phosphorus. Potash deposits were found underground across the Permian Basin in 1925. Two companies, Mosaic Potash Carlsbad (formerly IMC Global) and Intrepid Potash (formerly Mississippi Chemical Corporation), operate mining operations east of Carlsbad. Both mines employ a significant number of workers from surrounding communities; each company also contributes to local charities.

Education

Public schools
Carlsbad Municipal School District is the operating public school system for Carlsbad. Besides the before mentioned schools, Carlsbad Municipal Schools also operates a charter school, Jefferson Montessori Academy. The mission of the Carlsbad Board of Education is to create a public school environment which meets the individual educational needs of all children regardless of their ability, ethnicity, creed, gender or social standing.

Elementary schools
Cottonwood Elementary School
Desert Willow Elementary School
Early Childhood Education Center
Edison Elementary School
Hillcrest Preschool
Joe Stanley Smith Elementary School (Closed 2021)
Monterrey Elementary School
Ocotillo Elementary School
Sunset Elementary School
Jefferson Montessori Academy 

Secondary schools
Carlsbad Early College High School
Carlsbad High School
Carlsbad Intermediate School
Carlsbad Sixth Grade Academy
Carlsbad Schools Athletics
Carlsbad Schools Library
Jefferson Montessori Academy 

Private schools
Faith Christian Academy
St. Edwards Catholic School

Colleges and universities
New Mexico State University has a branch campus located in Carlsbad, offering certificate, associate degree, bachelor's degree, and continuing education programs. NMSUC has a student population of approximately 2,000 and a staff of 104 faculty. Previously known as the Carlsbad Instructional Center, the campus was established in 1950 as the state's first community college. It was renamed a branch of NMSU in 1960. The present-day main building was built in 1980; an additional instruction center was added in 1987 and the computer facilities wing was completed in 1996. By 2011, the campus had added an additional building to house its nursing program, the Allied Health and University Transfer Center.

Eddy County Beauty College is also located in Carlsbad, providing certification programs for beauticians.

Media and journalism

Print
Carlsbad is serviced by a daily (except Monday) newspaper, the Carlsbad Current-Argus.

Focus on Carlsbad is a quarterly magazine published with local articles related to living, shopping, and vacationing in Carlsbad.

Radio

Television
Channel 23 is a local television station shown on cable television. The channel airs coverage of special events and also local news; many residents host shows on topics from plant care to science. Classic films including 20,000 Leagues Under the Sea, Meet John Doe, and Scarlet Street are shown on Wednesdays. Channel23TV is unavailable on satellite television.

Sports
The Carlsbad Bats professional baseball team were a member of the independent Pecos League. The Bats were primarily a travel team in the league, but played two games in Carlsbad in 2011. Carlsbad was considered, but turned down, for a full-time franchise in 2012. Carlsbad recently constructed a youth sports complex on the southwest side of town, containing six softball and four soccer fields. Multiple local and regional tournaments are held at the complex yearly.

Carlsbad High School is a AAAAA school in the Fourth District of the New Mexico Activities Association. Carlsbad High School has teams competing in the sports of football, baseball, softball, basketball, track and field, golf, tennis, men's and women's soccer, swimming, wrestling, and rodeo.

The Carlsbad Velo Cycling Club, a local bicycle club began hosting the Cavern City Classic Omnium in 2012 with large success; weekly rides are held on Saturdays giving riders a chance to see much of the surrounding landscape. Annual races for running and walking are organized by the Carlsbad Runner's Club and National Night Out.

Infrastructure

Transportation

Major highways
Two main highways run through the city:
US Highway 62/180 is named Canal Street as it enters the city from the southwest; at the intersection of Greene Street, 62/180 heads east.
US Highway 285 is named Canal Street as it intersects 62/180 from the southeast; at the intersection of Pierce Street, 285 branches north.

Bridges
There are three road bridges that cross waterways and serve the municipality:
Bataan Bridge crosses the Pecos River on East Greene Street.
North Canal Bridge crosses the Pecos River on North Canal Street.
South Canal Bridge crosses Dark Canyon Draw on South Canal Street.

Mass transit
The Carlsbad Municipal Transit System (CMTS)  provides public transportation within the city limits of Carlsbad and portions of Eddy County immediately adjacent to the city. CMTS operates three fixed routes and a general dial-a-ride service. Established in June 1996, CMTS operates a fleet of 17 vans and services persons with disabilities, seniors, students, and the general public. Average monthly ridership is approximately 4,800.

New Mexico Transportation Services, a private company, provides daily transportation to and from the Waste Isolation Pilot Plant for employees at fixed pick up locations throughout town.

Bus service
Greyhound Lines stops in Carlsbad on route 463 between El Paso and Lubbock, Texas.

Airports

Regional
Cavern City Air Terminal (CNM) is located just south of Carlsbad, with Boutique Air currently offering non-stop service to Albuquerque and Dallas/Fort Worth under an Essential Air Service (EAS) contract.

International

Rail

BNSF Railway provides freight service in the Carlsbad area, mainly to the local potash mines. Two yard operations are present in Carlsbad: one between Muscatel Avenue and Orchard Lane, and the other between Greene and Church Streets. Currently there is no intercity passenger service. Passenger service to Carlsbad was previously operated by BNSF predecessor Santa Fe Railway. The former station at 110 E Fox Street is still standing.

Utilities

Energy
Xcel Energy provides electricity to the Carlsbad area. New Mexico Gas Company provides natural gas services to more than 500,000 customers in the state, including Carlsbad.

Sanitation
The City of Carlsbad is responsible for the delivery of drinking water and the treatment of wastewater. The city also provides trash service to residents. Trash is sent to the Sandpoint Landfill east of town operated by Eddy County.

Healthcare
Carlsbad Medical Center is the primary hospital facility serving the greater Carlsbad area, operated by Community Health Systems. CMC is a 127-bed acute-care facility, including a 24-hour emergency room, imaging systems, and other services.

On September 10, 2019, CNN televised a news story on The Carlsbad Medical Center. The story was titled, "When some patients don't pay, this hospital sues." The news item addressed the remote community's limited hospital care options, and seized wages for exorbitant billing.

The town is also home to dialysis clinics, MRI facilities, an oncology center, and specialty clinics. Carlsbad Mental Health Association provides mental-health services, substance-abuse treatment, family and youth counseling, psychiatric services and employee-assistance programs.

Research, development, and technology facilities
Carlsbad has several research facilities, such as the Carlsbad Environmental Monitoring and Research Center (operated by New Mexico State University) and the National Cave and Karst Research Institute (operated by New Mexico Tech, the National Park Service, and the City of Carlsbad). The United States Department of Energy's Sandia National Labs and Los Alamos National Laboratory each have branch operations in Carlsbad. The Carlsbad Department of Development and the City operate the Aero-Tech Industrial Technology Park including the Advanced Manufacturing and Innovation Training Center.

Points of interest
 Carlsbad Museum
 Carlsbad Skate Park
 The Cascades of Carlsbad
 Living Desert Zoo and Gardens State Park, which features a painting bear. Maggie Oso paints with her paws in a variety of non-toxic paint colors and heavy white paper that the zoo curator places in her holding area. Maggie can choose the color of paint to use and the pattern that she will paint. Maggie's paintings are matted and framed for the public to see. Maggie's art work has been featured in several art exhibits throughout Carlsbad.
 National Cave and Karst Research Institute
 Pecos River Flume
 Project Playground
 The Artist Gallery

Notable people
 Trevor Rogers, Major League Baseball pitcher for the Miami Marlins 
Shane Andrews, Major League Baseball
 Dan Blocker, actor who played "Hoss" Cartwright in the TV series Bonanza, was a sixth-grade teacher and coach at Eddy Elementary School
 Bruce Cabot, actor who played Jack Driscoll in the 1933 film King Kong; appeared in many of close friend John Wayne's films
 Jason D. Cunningham, Air Force Pararescueman who died saving lives of 10 fellow servicemen; Air Force Cross recipient
 Sam Etcheverry, professional football player in the National Football League and Canadian Football League
 Alfred Alexander Freeman, New Mexico territorial judge and Tennessee politician
 F. Drew Gaffney, Payload Specialist aboard STS-40 and professor at Vanderbilt University
 Mark Jackson, gridiron football player
Bob Kelly, American Football League defensive lineman and offensive lineman for the Houston Oilers, the Kansas City Chiefs, and the Cincinnati Bengals 
 Cody Ross, Major League Baseball outfielder for the Arizona Diamondbacks
 Barry Sadler, author, musician, and decorated combat veteran; best known for series of novels focusing on Casca Rufio Longinius and for composing song "Ballad of the Green Berets".
 Sonny Throckmorton, singer and songwriter
 Linda Wertheimer, senior correspondent for National Public Radio
 Jim White, discoverer and explorer of Carlsbad Caverns.
John Wooten, National Football League played for the Cleveland Browns and Washington Redskins

Gallery

Notes

References

External links

 City of Carlsbad official website
 Visit Carlsbad, New Mexico (tourism and visitor information)

 
Cities in New Mexico
Cities in Eddy County, New Mexico
County seats in New Mexico
Micropolitan areas of New Mexico
Populated places established in 1888
Atomic tourism
1888 establishments in New Mexico Territory